G4 (also known as G4TV) was an American pay television and digital network owned by Comcast Spectacor that primarily focused on video games.

The network was originally owned by G4 Media, a joint venture between the NBCUniversal Cable division of NBCUniversal and Dish Network, and first launched on April 24, 2002. In late 2012, G4's studio programming ceased in preparation for a planned relaunch as Esquire Network, as part of a licensing deal with Hearst Corporation, owner of Esquire magazine. Esquire Network would ultimately replace Style Network instead, on September 23, 2013. G4 announced in November 2014 that it would end all operations. The network was shut down on New Year's Eve 2014. By August 2013, it was reported that approximately 61,217,000 American households (53.61% of households with television) were receiving the network.

On July 24, 2020, a revival of the G4 brand was announced; the network relaunched on November 16, 2021. On October 16, 2022, it was announced that Comcast would soon be shutting down the network. Its final day of operation was November 18, 2022.

History

Original

Launch

G4 was launched on April 24, 2002, under the ownership of Comcast. The initial concept was to create a service similar to rival TechTV but targeted at 12-to-34-year-olds, an elusive demographic. The channel was soft launched with a week-long series of Pong matches. It was initially available to three million Comcast subscribers, and offered 13 half-hour programs.

G4 was created and originally led by Charles Hirschhorn, a former president of Walt Disney Television and Television Animation. He expected video game creators themselves to eventually produce programming for the channel. He envisioned that G4 could follow in the footsteps of MTV, which provided music video producers with a venue for non-traditional television programming. Hirschhorn intended G4 to become a vehicle for unconventional advertising. In 2002, G4 offered advertisers wide latitude to place their products on G4's programs, and even allowed their commercials to appear as if they were a part of the program. G4 offered what was called a "2 minute unit", which was an advertising package played as if it were part of a G4 program that was long enough to run an entire movie trailer. G4 offered to sell the right to have a game showcased on the show Pulse.

Merger with TechTV

On March 25, 2004, Vulcan Inc. announced that G4 Media would acquire TechTV and merge the two networks. The combined network was rebranded as G4techTV. On February 15, 2005, less than a year after the merger, the "TechTV" brand was dropped from the channel's name. A Canadian version of TechTV, originally launched on September 7, 2001, would also be relaunched under the "G4techTV" branding and would retain the brand until 2009.

In September 2005, Neal Tiles replaced Hirschhorn as the channel's president. Tiles had previously been a senior marketing executive at DirecTV, Fox Sports and ESPN. He announced that G4 would be retooled as a male-oriented channel, stating that "guys like to play games, but not necessarily watch a bunch of shows with games on the screen".

Comcast announced on October 12, 2006, that it would consolidate its west coast entertainment operations, including G4, E! and Style Network into a new group headed by Ted Harbert, who had formerly run E!. It was announced that the upper management of the G4 channel would relocate to E!'s Los Angeles office. Harbert gave his opinion at the time that the focus of the channel on "gaming has been demonstrated as being too narrow."

In April 2007, G4, in association with Earth911, launched an electronic-waste-recycling campaign called Gcycle.

On February 17, 2009, it was reported that G4 intended to cut back its original programming. X-Play would be reduced to three nights a week while Attack of the Show! would be cut to four nights a week. Consequently, a number of the staff and production crew involved in the shows would be laid off. Layla Kayleigh also left G4 in April 2009 after Neal Tiles announced that her contract would not be renewed.

It was announced during Comic-Con 2010 that G4 would be the exclusive North American broadcaster of Marvel Anime, which made its television debut in 2011. During the week of July 26-August 1, 2010, G4 changed its logo to 4G as a promotion for Sprint Nextel's next generation wireless internet service.

2010–2014

On November 1, 2010, DirecTV announced that it had removed G4 from its channel lineup, citing low interest among their subscriber base and low Nielsen ratings as the primary reason for dropping of the channel. DirecTV commented that it was "...unable to reach an agreement to continue carrying the G4 channel and it has been removed from the DirecTV channel lineup."

It was reported that the UFC and WWE were in separate talks to buy G4 in 2011. The UFC eventually partnered with Fox, while WWE launched its own network on February 24, 2014.

On January 5, 2012, Neal Tiles stepped down as CEO. He was replaced by former NBCUniversal marketing chief Adam Stotsky. Long-time employees Adam Sessler and Kevin Pereira both departed the network during the first half of 2012.

On October 26, 2012, it was announced that X-Play and Attack of the Show! would be cancelled by the end of the year, ending G4's studio programming.

In December 2012, NBCUniversal signed a brand licensing deal with the Hearst Corporation, owner of Esquire magazine, to relaunch G4 into Esquire Network which would air shows aimed at a metrosexual audience about travel, cooking, fashion and non-sports related male programming, including the addition of acquired and archive NBCU content such as Party Down, Parks and Recreation, and week-delayed episodes of Late Night with Jimmy Fallon. The rebranding was scheduled to take place on April 22, 2013, but was moved to an unspecified date in the summer on April 15, 2013. Network general manager Adam Stotsky stated the rebranding was pushed back in order to have a broader original series slate to launch with than would have been available for the April launch. Stotsky confirmed that a new season of American Ninja Warrior would air on the network in the summer. In May 2013, the launch date was pushed to September 23, 2013, with its first program being an 80th anniversary special for Esquire.

On September 9, 2013, news broke that NBCUniversal would instead replace the Style Network with Esquire Network, leaving G4 "as is for the foreseeable future, though it's highly unlikely the company will invest in more original programming". On September 23, 2013, G4 was dropped by Time Warner Cable and Bright House Networks (Bright House carriage contracts were negotiated by Time Warner Cable), citing the network's low viewership as "(not a) good value for our customers". Verizon FiOS discontinued the channel on October 1, 2013, and Cablevision did so on October 10, 2013, pursuant to a filing with the Connecticut Department of Public Utility Control (that state's utility service regulator) a month prior, that NBCUniversal had plans to discontinue G4's operations as of the October 10 date, though only the discontinuation of carriage by Cablevision occurred.

Late in October 2013, Charter Communications, which was one of the charter carriers of TechTV when it was a sister of that network under the ownership of Vulcan Ventures, announced its intention to drop G4 on December 17; sister network Cloo replaced G4 on its systems. On November 1, 2013, Dish Network removed it from the lineup with Esquire Network replacing G4, ending all carriage of the network from direct broadcast satellite services. Cox ceased carriage of G4 in all markets on December 31, 2013.

Comcast removed G4 from all its cable and satellite systems nationwide on January 6, 2014; the network continued to be carried on other cable systems.

Certain cable operators reported that the network would end all on-air operations on November 30, 2014, and the aforementioned providers continued airing the network until the alleged cutoff date (or when their contracts with G4 were fully exhausted), ending all carriage of the network from cable providers and cable television services.
 
The final day of G4 in its previous iteration was a marathon of the Top 100 Video Games of All Time, followed by the last program being the debut episode of X-Play. A note on the G4 website's program schedule was added to that particular episode saying "Thanks for watching G4." The network would cease broadcasting with a game of Pong on the screen, referencing the network's launch, gradually getting smaller and smaller before becoming just a small dot, followed by the sound of the San Diego Comic-Con attendee Ramses to Kevin Pereira shouting "I'm at Comic-Con!!!", (possibly alluding to G4 dying and going to Comic-Con, occasionally nicknamed "nerd heaven"), as the dot shut off like an analog TV alongside the Atari 2600 version of Donkey Kong's death sounds and the Game Boy start-up chime, thus symbolically ending the network with a "game over".

Revival

Pre-launch and B4G4
On July 24, 2020, the Twitter accounts of G4, Attack of the Show! and X-Play were reactivated to post a teaser video announcing a revival of the network slated for 2021. The teaser was released during "Comic-Con@Home", the first virtual streaming edition of the San Diego Comic-Con. G4's website was reopened with a playable game of Pong which, if won, redirected to a mailing list to sign up for updates and a free shirt promo code. The campaign was in-reference to the network's original launch in 2002 and their shutdown in 2014. Comcast would transfer operations of G4 from NBCUniversal to its Spectacor division (former owners of the now-defunct PRISM regional premium cable television channel).

On August 12, 2020, Olivia Munn, the former co-host of Attack of the Show!, was reportedly in final talks for a multi-year deal with G4.

On September 4, 2020, the official G4 YouTube channel uploaded a video featuring former X-Play host Adam Sessler as one of his fictional characters, Crazy Adam, asking for fans to submit applications to become a G4 host or simply nominate their favorite personalities with the hashtag, #G4NeedsTalent.

On November 16, 2020, G4 announced A Very Special G4 Holiday Reunion Special, a scripted special hosted by Ron Funches featuring interviews with Kevin Pereira, Olivia Munn, Adam Sessler, Morgan Webb, Kristin Adams, and Blair Herter. The special premiered on November 24 on Twitch and YouTube; Syfy would also air the special on November 27. At the special's end, wrestler Xavier "King" Woods / Austin Creed would be the first newly announced host for G4's relaunch, after beginning a campaign on Twitter to become a G4 personality in August 2020. On the same day of the special's premiere, G4 launched Gravython, a charity drive that would be raising funds for a variety of community partners.

On January 28, 2021, G4 announced that both Attack of the Show! and X-Play would be revived due to high demand from fans. They also gave a tentative date of Summer 2021 for the network's relaunch. The following day, the company launched the B4G4 brand, featuring short-form experimental content on YouTube and Twitter created to gain feedback from audiences that would help determine the shows for G4's relaunch. On February 12, 2021, the B4G4 iterations of Attack of the Show! and X-Play began, with Kevin Pereira and Adam Sessler returning to host their respective series; these involved humorous sketches for AOTS and Let's Plays with other gaming-based streamers and YouTubers alongside Sessler for X-Play. On the same day, it was announced that Esports shoutcasters Indiana "Froskurinn" Black and Ovilee May would be the network's new hosts, helming the series The Bleep Esports Show - a satirical program focusing on current gaming-related news. In March, the network also began livestreaming on both Twitch and YouTube, where its hosts interact with the audience and do watch-alongs to new B4G4 videos.

On April 2, 2021, G4 uploaded a video on their YouTube channel revealing the return of "Epic April", a month dedicated to new announcements. On April 5, G4 revealed the development of a new competitive series hosted by Xavier "King" Woods / Austin Creed in partnership with WWE to air in the fall. On April 11, Esports shoutcaster, The Titan Games commentator and former AEW commentator Alex “Goldenboy” Mendez was announced to be joining the network as a new host. On April 14, 2021, G4 announced that Ninja Warrior, an English-dubbed version of the Japanese show SASUKE (itself the original Japanese version of American Ninja Warrior), would be returning to the network with 3 new tournaments and a total of 167 episodes. On April 19, comedian and YouTuber Kassem G was announced to be joining the network as a new host. On April 28, Adam Sessler and Kassem G revealed during a livestream that cosplayer Jefferson "Jeffersawrus" Carvey was the network's first #G4NeedsTalent hire. Its final "Epic April" announcement was made on the 30th, where Virtual YouTuber and livestreamer character CodeMiko, along with her creator known only as "The Technician", would be joining as a new host.

On May 5, 2021, G4 was announced to be the official broadcaster of Dungeons & Dragons Live, airing on July 16 and 17. On May 14, YouTuber and podcaster Gina Darling was revealed during a livestream with Adam Sessler and Kassem G to be joining as a new host.

Relaunch
On October 12, 2021, it was announced that G4's cable network would officially return on November 16, 2021.

In November 2021, it was announced that airings of select episodes of the web series Scott the Woz would air on G4 in one-hour blocks. The show was scheduled to debut on December 7, 2021 at 6:30pm EST but due to technical difficulties involving Amazon Web Services, it did not air in that timeslot. The show would officially debut at 10:30pm EST.

The network officially relaunched on November 16 at 6 a.m. EST, with a marathon of the original Ninja Warrior, occasionally featuring reruns of the Very Special G4 Holiday Reunion Special from the previous year. The Catastrophic Launch Special was broadcast on the network's Twitch and YouTube channels that same evening, before airing on the cable network on the next day.

On March 7, 2022, G4 launched a FAST channel on Pluto TV called G4 Select, which carries most of G4's regular programming. As part of an exclusive partnership, the channel would also feature new content catered to free, linear streaming audiences. The channel was later added to Vizio's WatchFree platform on June 16, 2022.

End of revival 

On October 16, 2022, it was announced that G4 would be ceasing operations after relaunching the previous year. Comcast Spectacor chairman and CEO Dave Scott wrote a memo to employees: "Team: As you know, G4 was re-introduced last year to tap into the popularity of gaming," Scott wrote. "We invested to create the new G4 as an online and TV destination for fans to be entertained, be inspired, and connect with gaming content.

Over the past several months, we worked hard to generate that interest in G4, but viewership is low and the network has not achieved sustainable financial results. This is certainly not what we hoped for, and, as a result, we have made the very difficult decision to discontinue G4’s operations, effective immediately. I know this is disappointing news, and I’m disappointed, too. I want to thank you and everyone on the G4 team for the hard work and commitment to the network.

Our human resources team is reaching out to you to provide you with support, discuss other opportunities that may be available, and answer any questions you may have."

Several factors that led to G4's discontinuation ranged from low viewership, a lack of audience strategy, ever-changing and absent leadership, competition with streaming content creators on YouTube and Twitch, cord-cutting, and high expenditures. G4 Select would be removed from Pluto TV on October 19, 2022 during an episode of Attack of the Show: Vibe Check, the network fully sunsetting operations on October 21, ending two minutes into Smosh; G4 Select would later cease on Vizio. G4 in itself left Philo, YouTube TV, Xfinity, and Cox prior to the shutdown, with Fios being the last to carry the network until the true discontinuation date, November 18, 2022, two days after the first anniversary of the re-launch. 

The final programs aired were a marathon of Xplay, with segments from other G4 programs added during commercial breaks or between episodes. Similar to how the original network ended in 2014 with the first episode of Xplay from 2001, the final full episode to air was the first episode from the Xplay relaunch in 2021. This was followed by a zoomed-out photo of former Attack of the Show host Gina Darling's forehead, with a still game of Pong etched onto it and text reading, "G4" and "Thanks 4 watching!," along with a deadpan voice saying "I'm at Comic-Con!," referencing the first time the network stopped transmitting. A screen reading "THANK YOU FOR WATCHING" was set to appear after midnight, however Fios cut their signal just seconds prior to midnight, ending in the middle of the sign-off.

Programming

In addition to video game culture, G4's programming encompasses geek, fandom, genre, and general audience shows aimed at young adult men. The network primarily livestreams its original programming on their Twitch and YouTube channels. These livestreams are edited to air on the linear television channel and video on demand platforms the next day. The television channel's programming currently features reruns of past G4 shows, as well as other acquired programs. Pulse was a prerecorded weekly news show that focused on the gaming industry that ran on cable TV channel G4. In November 2004, along with other G4techTV programs, the show was cancelled. News segments were merged with revamped version of The Screen Savers (later Attack of the Show), though eventually those duties were taken over by the editorial staff of X-Play.

G4's website previously featured game trailers and reviews, select video clips of its original shows, and web original programming. The website continued providing entertainment-related news articles until May 31, 2013, with the last article posted on G4's website as a replacement for the site's schedule section, was a notice stating that "NBCUniversal has discontinued all operations for G4" seven days after the network left the air. The website was relaunched on July 24, 2020, coinciding with the announcement of the network's revival.

Notable hosts/correspondents

2002–2013: Hosts 

 Kristin Adams, host of Cheat! (2005-2009) and correspondent for X-Play (2008–12)
 Alex Albrecht, correspondent for Attack of the Show! (2012) and host of The Screen Savers (2004)
 Candace Bailey, co-host of Attack of the Show!
 Blair Butler, comic book correspondent for "Fresh Ink" on Attack of the Show!
 Jessica Chobot, correspondent for X-Play and Attack of the Show!, co-host of Proving Ground
 Ryan Dunn, Co-host of Proving Ground
 Laura Foy, co-host of g4tv.com
 Chris Gore, movie correspondent for "DVDuesday" on Attack of the Show!
 Alison Haislip, correspondent/co-host of Attack of the Show! and American Ninja Warrior
 Chris Hardwick, host of Web Soup
 Grace Helbig, correspondent for Attack of the Show!
 Blair Herter, co-host of X-Play and correspondent for Attack of the Show!
 Matt Iseman, co-host of American Ninja Warrior
 Geoff Keighley, co-host of g4tv.com
 Sarah Lane, co-host of The Screen Savers/Attack of the Show!
 Chi-Lan Lieu, co-host of The Screen Savers until 2005
 Michael Louden, co-host of Arena until 2003
 Victor Lucas, host of Judgment Day
 Matt Mira, correspondent for "Gadget Pr0n" on Attack of the Show!
 Diane Mizota, host of "Filter" until 2005
 Brendan Moran, co-host of The Screen Savers, correspondent for Attack of the Show!
 Jonny Moseley, co-host of American Ninja Warrior
 Olivia Munn, co-host of Attack of the Show! (2005–10)
 Kevin Pereira, co-host of The Screen Savers/Attack of the Show! (2005–12) and Arena
 Kevin Rose, co-host of Attack of the Show! and The Screen Savers
 Lee Reherman, co-host of Arena
 Zach Selwyn, correspondent for Attack of the Show!
 Adam Sessler, co-host of X-Play (1998-2012) and regular appearances on Attack of the Show!
 Tiffany Smith, correspondent for X-Play and Attack of the Show!
 Angela Sun, correspondent for American Ninja Warrior
 Tommy Tallarico, co-host of Judgment Day and video game composer
 Sara Underwood, anchor of "The Feed" on Attack of the Show!
 Morgan Webb, co-host of X-Play, guest co-host of Attack of the Show! and host of G4 Underground
 Wil Wheaton, co-host of Arena until 2003
 Tina Wood, host of g4tv.com
 William Frederick Knight, voice actor in anime and video games who was on Attack of the Show! often, most notably as Bill, co-host of the segment At the Bootys

Second Run Hosts (2021–2022)
 Kevin Pereira - Co-host of Attack of the Show! 
 Adam Sessler - Co-host of Xplay
 Austin Creed - Co-host of Attack of the Show! and WWE x G4's Arena
 Ovilee May - Co-host of Boosted, anime correspondent for Attack of The Show!
 Indiana "Froskurinn" Black - Co-host of Boosted, Xplay, and G4 Gameday LCS
 Alex “Goldenboy” Mendez - Co-host of Boosted and Crash Course. Host, fighting game and arena shooter genre correspondent for Xplay.
 Kassem "Kassem G" Gharaibeh - Co-host of Attack of the Show!and Fresh Ink!
 Abby Russell - Xplay 
 Danny Peña - Xplay games editorial lead. 
 Joe Jurado - Xplay
 Jake G. Bennett - Xplay sports-simulation game genre correspondent 
 Jefferson “Jeffersawrus” Carvey - Xplay roleplaying game genre correspondent 
 CodeMiko / The Technician - Attack of The Show! 
 Gina Darling - Co-host of Attack of the Show! and WWE x G4's Arena
 Jirard "Dragonrider / The Completionist" Khalil - Co-host of Xplay
 Will Neff - Co-host of Attack of the Show! and Name Your Price, Host of Hey, Donna!
 Fiona Nova - Co-host of Attack of the Show!, anchor of The Feedback
 Corey "The Black Hokage" Smallwood - Co-host of Xplay
 Kitboga - Greenlit show based on his livestreams on Twitch (never materialized) 
 AustinShow - Co-host of Name Your Price
 JustaMinx - presenter of Name Your Price
 James "Dash" Patterson- Co-host of G4 Gameday LCS
 Sam "Kobe" Hartman-Kenzler - Co-host of G4 Gameday LCS
 Barento "Raz" Mohammed - Co-host of G4 Gameday LCS
 Clayton "CaptainFlowers" Raines - Co-host of G4 Gameday LCS
 B Dave Walters - Host/DM of Dungeons and Dragons Presents: Invitation To Party
 Case Blackwell - co-anchor of The Feedback
 Emily Rose Jacobson - presenter of Xplay ("Plus" and "Hex" formats)
 Brian "B-Comp" Compton - co-host of Fresh Ink!
 Vanessa Guerrero - presenter of AOTS: Vibe Check, host of Full Screen Attack!, co-host of Fresh Ink!

See also
 G4 (Canadian TV channel)
 VENN

References

2002 establishments in the United States
2014 disestablishments in the United States
2021 establishments in the United States
2022 disestablishments in the United States
Comcast
Companies based in Los Angeles
Defunct television networks in the United States
G4 Media
NBCUniversal networks
NBCUniversal
Television channels and stations established in 2002
Television channels and stations disestablished in 2014
Television channels and stations established in 2021
Television channels and stations disestablished in 2022
Video game culture
X-Play
Re-established companies